Friedmann Peak is a prominent peak rising to  in the central part of Kennett Ridge, in the Darwin Mountains of Antarctica. It was named after Roseli Ocampo Friedmann, professor of microbiology at Florida A&M University, Tallahassee, Florida, who worked five austral summers in the McMurdo Dry Valleys, and was co-discoverer there (with E. Imre Friedmann) of endolithic microorganisms in the Beacon sandstone, 1976.

References

Mountains of Oates Land